Family, Career and Community Leaders of America (FCCLA, formerly known as Future Homemakers of America) is a nonprofit national career and technical student organization for young men and women in Family and Consumer Sciences education in public and private school through grade 6–12. Since 1945, the goal of FCCLA members has been to make a difference in their families, careers, and communities by addressing personal, work, and societal issues through Family and Consumer Sciences education.

Today over 175,000 members in more than 5,300 chapters are active in a network of associations in all 50 U.S. states, in addition to the US Virgin Islands and Puerto Rico. Chapter projects focus on a variety of youth concerns, including teen pregnancy, parenting, family relationships, substance abuse, peer pressure, environment, nutrition and fitness, teen violence, and career exploration. Involvement in FCCLA offers members the opportunity to expand their leadership potential and develop skills for life—planning, goal setting, problem solving, decision making, and interpersonal communication—necessary in the home and workplace.

Family and Consumer Sciences (FCS) teachers support individual school chapters and are known as Advisers.

Mission 
To promote personal growth and leadership development through Family and Consumer Sciences education. Focusing on the multiple roles of family member, wage earner and community leader, members develop skills for life through: character development, creative and critical thinking, interpersonal communication, practical knowledge, and career preparation.

History 

The American Home Economics Association and Office of Education co-sponsored a national organization of high school clubs focused on home economics. The organization's name, creed, and motto were decided by the teenagers themselves. The focus groups chose "Future Homemakers of America".  For the southern states that had segregation, a sister organization was created; the Black teenagers chose the name "New Homemakers of America". In the summer of 1945, Future Homemakers had over 90,000 members and New Homemakers had nearly 20,000. Four years later, the combined groups had 250,000 members.

In June 1945, the Future Homemakers of America was founded at a convention in Chicago, Illinois by Janet Barber and Edna P. Amidon.
The first national convention was held in Kansas City, Missouri in July 1948. The organization's first male national officer, Toney Bingham,  from Washington, DC, was elected in July 1973. In December 1977, Rhode Island was the last of the 53 state associations (including the District of Columbia, Puerto Rico, and the Virgin Islands) to affiliate. Monya Frazier from Florence, South Carolina, was elected as the organization's first African American national president in 1981. In July 1980, The National Board of Directors approved the purchase of land on which to build a national headquarters and leadership center in Reston, Virginia. September 28, 1981 was the date of the official groundbreaking ceremony was held at the building site in Reston, Virginia. The national headquarters and leadership center was dedicated during the 1983 National Leadership Meeting in Washington, DC. In July 1986, Thomas Lucas from Milton, West Virginia, was elected the organization's first male national president. In July 1999, voting delegates at the National Leadership Conference in Boston, Massachusetts voted in favor of the proposed name change from the Future Homemakers of America to the Family, Career and Community Leaders of America. In July 2015, FCCLA hosted a “70 Years Strong” anniversary rally on Capitol Hill, drawing thousands of FCCLA members to advocate for strong Family and Consumer Sciences (FACS) education in schools.

Conferences 
There are three annual conferences for FCCLA members: National Leadership Conference (NLC), National Fall Conference (NFC) and the Capital Leadership conference.

The largest FCCLA meeting is the National Leadership Conference (NLC). Members can participate in competitive events, general sessions, exhibits expo & college fair, and many other leadership development opportunities. Advisers will have access to professional development sessions, networking and volunteer opportunities.

There is the National Fall Conference (NFC) which is scheduled in the late Fall and are held in a different city each year.  Students and advisers convene to share ideas, learn about exciting programs leadership skills, and compete in various skill demonstration events.

The Capital Leadership Conference allows members to travel to Washington, DC, to meet with their specific US Senate and Congressional representatives. Members discuss issues supporting FCCLA's Mission.

Contributions 
Members routinely contribute to the surrounding community by raising money for community programs like homeless aid and youth abuse prevention.

Competitions 
STAR Events

STAR Events (Students Taking Action with Recognition) recognize members for proficiency and achievement in chapter and individual projects, leadership skills, and career preparation. STAR Events offer individual skill development and application of learning through the following activities-
 Cooperative – teams work to accomplish specific goals
 Individualized – members work alone to accomplish specific goals
 Competitive – individual or team performance measured by an established set of criteria
Students compete in local or regional competitions and winners continue to compete at their State Leadership Conference. The culmination of Star Events is at the National Leadership Conference.

Safe Rides Save Lives PSA

Safe Rides – Save Lives PSA contest is an opportunity for FCCLA members to engage in creating teen-friendly safety messaging through a video Public Service Announcement (PSA).

Community Service

National Outreach Project 
Each year Family, Career and Community Leaders of America, Inc (FCCLA) establishes a National Outreach Project with a partner organization to reach to the community and help work towards a cause. National Executive Council (NEC) members and other FCCLA staff members discuss and present ways FCCLA and another organization can work together on a National Outreach Project.

FCCLA's National Outreach Project is a national community service activity that gives our state delegations/members the opportunity to make a united impact concerning a need that the National Executive Council decides to address. Participation from FCCLA members is optional. When state delegations/members choose to participate, each state/member works with their local chapters and members to fundraise and collect items from schools and communities through service. The goal of this project is to have each student get actively involved in making a difference by uniting together with the National Outreach Project. FCCLA wants members to see and know first hand that even a small effort made by many can have a huge and positive impact on others.

FCCLA started the National Outreach Project at the 1997 National Leadership Meeting in San Diego, California where 38 states participated in donating over 6,000 various items to shelters/agencies in San Diego. FCCLA continued the project at the 1998 National Leadership Meeting in New Orleans, Louisiana where 46 states donated almost 10,000 items. The focus of the project changed in 2000 to giving to a national charity instead of collecting items to donate.

Structure 
The organization is governed by a board of directors consisting of business and industry, Family and Consumer Sciences, and youth representatives.  The organization annually elects 10 students to serve on the National Executive Council.  The National Director serves as the Chief Administrative Officer.

State Associations elect state officers and have state advisers.

References 

Non-profit organizations based in Reston, Virginia
Student organizations in the United States
Clubs and societies in the United States